Woodlawn is a village in Hamilton County, Ohio, United States. The population was 3,916 at the 2020 census.

History
Woodlawn was platted in 1876.

Geography
Woodlawn is located at  (39.251758, -84.470675).

Demographics

2010 census
As of the census of 2010, there were 3,294 people, 1,507 households, and 766 families living in the village. The racial makeup of the village was 26.1% White, 67.2% African American, 0.2% Native American, 2.9% Asian, 0.1% Pacific Islander, 1.1% from other races, and 2.5% from two or more races. Hispanic or Latino of any race were 2.3% of the population.

There were 1,507 households, of which 24.2% had children under the age of 18 living with them, 26.7% were married couples living together, 18.8% had a female householder with no husband present, 5.2% had a male householder with no wife present, and 49.2% were non-families. 41.9% of all households were made up of individuals, and 7.9% had someone living alone who was 65 years of age or older. The average household size was 2.10 and the average family size was 2.93.

The median age in the village was 39.6 years. 18.9% of residents were under the age of 18; 10.6% were between the ages of 18 and 24; 27.7% were from 25 to 44; 26.9% were from 45 to 64; and 15.8% were 65 years of age or older. The gender makeup of the village was 45.0% male and 55.0% female.

2000 census
As of the census of 2000, there were 2,816 people, 1,235 households, and 687 families living in the village. The population density was 1,089.3 people per square mile (419.8/km). There were 1,330 housing units at an average density of 514.5 per square mile (198.3/km). The racial makeup of the village was 27.10% White, 68.39% African American, 0.11% Native American, 2.38% Asian, 0.89% from other races, and 1.14% from two or more races. Hispanic or Latino of any race were 1.28% of the population.

There were 1,235 households, out of which 21.6% had children under the age of 18 living with them, 33.7% were married couples living together, 17.9% had a female householder with no husband present, and 44.3% were non-families. 37.1% of all households were made up of individuals, and 7.5% had someone living alone who was 65 years of age or older. The average household size was 2.27 and the average family size was 3.06.

In the village, the population was spread out, with 22.3% under the age of 18, 9.9% from 18 to 24, 32.2% from 25 to 44, 23.4% from 45 to 64, and 12.1% who were 65 years of age or older. The median age was 36 years. For every 100 females there were 95.4 males. For every 100 females age 18 and over, there were 91.7 males.

The median income for a household in the village was $42,978, and the median income for a family was $51,893. Males had a median income of $40,417 versus $31,142 for females. The per capita income for the village was $24,204. About 9.1% of families and 10.4% of the population were below the poverty line, including 18.6% of those under age 18 and 8.4% of those age 65 or over.

References

External links
Village website

Villages in Hamilton County, Ohio
Villages in Ohio
1876 establishments in Ohio
Populated places established in 1876